Vincent Ngaro is a Cook Island professional rugby league footballer who played in the 2000s and 2010s who has represented the Cook Islands.

In 2009 Ngaro played in the 2009 Pacific Cup. He scored a try in the 22-20 qualifying round victory over Samoa. He also scored a try in the 24-22 semi-final victory over Fiji.

In 2011 Ngaro won the top flight (A1) Manly-Warringah District Junior Rugby League Grand Final for the Narraweena Hawks.

In 2014 he was player of the year in the Sydney Shield competition.

References

Cook Islands national rugby league team players
Cook Island rugby league players
Living people
Year of birth missing (living people)
Rugby articles needing expert attention